Events in the year 1957 in the Republic of India.

Incumbents
 President of India – Dr. Rajendra Prasad
 Prime Minister of India – Pandit Jawaharlal Nehru
 Vice President of India – Sarvepalli Radhakrishnan
 Chief Justice of India – Sudhi Ranjan Das

Governors
 Andhra Pradesh – Chandulal Madhavlal Trivedi (until 1 August), Bhim Sen Sachar (starting 1 August)
 Assam – Saiyid Fazal Ali 
 Bihar – R. R. Diwakar (until 5 July), Zakir Hussain (starting 5 July)
 Karnataka – Jayachamarajendra Wadiyar 
 Kerala – Burgula Ramakrishna Rao 
 Madhya Pradesh – Pattabhi Sitaramayya (until 13 June), Hari Vinayak Pataskar (starting 13 June)
 Maharashtra – Sri Prakasa
 Odisha – Bhim Sen Sachar (until 31 July), Yeshwant Narayan Sukthankar (starting 31 July)
 Punjab – Chandeshwar Prasad Narayan Singh 
 Rajasthan – Gurumukh Nihal Singh 
 Uttar Pradesh – Kanhaiyalal Maneklal Munshi 
 West Bengal – Padmaja Naidu

Events
 National income - 137,104 million
 January 26 - Portuguese Indian troops open fire at TarakPardi in Bombay State for securing right of pass between enclaves of Dadra and Nagar Haveli.
 April 1 - Second Nehru ministry adopts Decimalisation of Indian rupee and discontinue the concept of anna coin system.
 April 5 – First elected government of Kerala. Communist Party of India won the elections and E. M. S. Namboodiripad became the first chief minister of united Kerala.
 August 25 - Indian Polo Team won the Polo World cup held at France.
 September 1 - Indian Air Force inducts its first jet bomber Canberra at Squadron 5, Agra.
 December 4 - Hindustan Shipyard delivers its first passenger cum cargo vessel M V Andaman.

Date not known 

 V. S. Wakankar discovers Bhimbetka rock shelter cave paintings.

Law
 India passes a bill making Kashmir under its control as part of the Union.
 Copyright Act

Sport
Balbir Singh Sr. became the first hockey player to be awarded the Padma Shri.

Births
1 February – Jackie Shroff, actor.
10 March –  Thanu Padmanabhan, theoretical physicist and cosmologist (d. 2021)
20 October – Dennis Joseph, scriptwriter and director (d. 2021)
Thomas Zacharia, computational scientist.

Deaths
5 April – Alagappa Chettiar, businessman and philanthropist (born 1909).
30 August – N. S. Krishnan, comedian, actor, playback singer and writer (born 1908).
5 December – Hussain Ahmed Madani, Islamic scholar (born 1879).

See also 
 List of Bollywood films of 1957

References

 
India
Years of the 20th century in India